The longnose houndshark (Iago garricki) is a houndshark of the family Triakidae. It is found in the western Pacific off northern Australia and Vanuatu, between latitudes 9° S and 26° S, at depths between 250 and 475 m. It can grow up to a length of 75 cm.

References

External links
 Fishes of Australia : Iago garricki

longnose houndshark
Fish of the Philippines
Fauna of Vanuatu
Marine fish of Northern Australia
Taxa named by Pierre Fourmanoir
Taxa named by Jacques Rivaton
longnose houndshark